The Egg Hunt is the debut studio album by alternative rock band Making April. It was released in 2009. The album was produced by Adam Richman.

Track listing
 "So Bad" – 3:20 
 "Brighter Bright" – 4:18
 "Bailey" – 3:45
 "Safe But Sorry" – 4:10
 "Stay the Night" – 4:39
 "Streetlights" – 4:34 
 "Wide Awake" – 4:01 
 "Let It Ride" – 5:42
 "Hey Katie" – 3:50
 "Don't Go" – 4:32

Bonus tracks
 "So Bad" (acoustic) (iTunes bonus track) – 2:55
 "Tag Along" (Japanese bonus track) – 3:42

References

2009 debut albums
Making April albums